The Minimalism of Erik Satie is an album by European jazz group the Vienna Art Orchestra featuring interpretations of compositions by Erik Satie which was first released in 1984 on the Hat ART label.

Reception

The Allmusic review stated "The Minimalism of Erik Satie is a rare example of the pairing of jazz and classical that actually works on both ends. Recommended".

Early editions of The Penguin Guide to Jazz awarded the release a "Crown" signifying a recording that the authors "feel a special admiration or affection for".

Track listing
All compositions by Erik Satie except as indicated
 "Reflections on Aubade" - 2:58
 "Reflections on Méditation" - 3:35
 "Reflections on Sévère Réprimande" - 2:57
 "Reflections on Idylle" - 4:01
 "Gnossienne No 3" - 3:00
 "Reflections on Gnossienne No. 2" - 4:25
 "Reflections on Gnossienne No. 1" - 5:53
 "Satie Ist Mir Im Traum 3 X Nicht Erschienen" (Mathias Rüegg) - 6:23
 "Vexations 1801" - 8:51
 "Vexations 1611" - 9:44
 "Vexations 2105" - 23:21

Personnel
Mathias Rüegg - arranger, conductor 
Hannes Kottek, Karl Fian - trumpet, flugelhorn
Christian Radovan - trombone
Jon Sass - tuba
Wolfgang Puschnig - sopranino saxophone, alto saxophone, bass clarinet, flute
Harry Sokal - soprano saxophone, tenor saxophone, flute
Roman Schwaller - tenor saxophone, clarinet
Woody Schabata - vibraphone
Wolfgang Reisinger - percussion
Lauren Newton - voice

References

1984 albums
Hathut Records albums
Vienna Art Orchestra albums